Joseph Henry 'Joe' Condon (born February 15, 1935  January 2, 2012) was an American computer scientist, engineer and physicist, who spent most of his career at Bell Labs. The son of Edward Condon (a distinguished American nuclear physicist, pioneer in quantum mechanics and a participant in the development of radar and nuclear weapons during World War II as part of the Manhattan Project) and Emilie Honzik Condon, he was named after the 19th-century American physicist Joseph Henry.

Education
Condon developed an interest in physics and electronics at an early age and credited his introduction to analytical thinking to an anonymous instrument maker. He attended Johns Hopkins University and received his BS degree in physics in 1958, and Northwestern University where he received a Ph.D. in physics in 1963.

Career
After graduate school, Condon joined the Metallurgy Research Division of AT&T Bell Laboratories at Murray Hill, New Jersey. He arrived about the same time that the division split. Formerly physics, metallurgy, and chemistry were under one executive director. After the split, physics had its own director, and chemistry and metallurgy were under another. He worked for five years on solid-state physics and metals at low temperatures  electronic band structure of metals by means of the oscillatory diamagnetic susceptibility (the De Haas–van Alphen effect). His studies in beryllium and silver (19661968) showed that magnetic domains (later called 'Condon domains') form in non-ferromagnetic metals when the oscillating differential magnetic susceptibility is greater than unity. He developed the theory and verified it experimentally.

Condon then became interested more in electronics engineering, moving out of physics.  He was exposed to UNIX on the Honeywell 516 machines in the early 1970s.

In the 1960s, Condon contributed to the development of local area network digital telephone switching.
Condon and Ken Thompson promoted the use of the C programming language for AT&T's switching system control programs. Condon acquired a small AT&T PBX (telephone switch) that handled about 50 phones; he made the necessary hardware changes and Thompson wrote the necessary software programs. The PBX code rewrite in C was a success and hastened the adoption of C for all switching system software within AT&T.

Circa 19681969, Condon was the head of department 13 which owned a PDP-7 computer. The computer was loaned to Dennis Ritchie and Ken Thompson, who used it to create the famous early computer game Space Travel and to port various features of the recently cancelled Multics project, developments which directly led to the development of the Unix operating system and all of its modern derivatives.

In 1975 Condon joined the Computer Research Center at Bell Labs where the C programming language and the UNIX operating system were created. Condon and his colleagues automated the laborious and error-prone task of manually converting drawings to fabricate circuit boards through their system, the Unix Circuit Design System (UCDS), enabling rapid prototyping.

In collaboration with Thompson, Condon created the chess-playing machine Belle. Condon designed custom hardware while Ken designed software.

In 1982 Condon collaborated with Andrew Ogielski to create the spin glass machine, a single-purpose computer "5-10 times faster than the Cray-1" designed to facilitate Monte Carlo calculations for theoretical physicists to determine the properties of a class of recently discovered complex magnetic materials such as spin glasses and various random antiferromagnets, thus combining his interests in digital systems and physics. In Condon's obituary, Physics Today called his work on the spin-glass machine a "classic" that "remain[s] accurate to this day, despite immense increases in computing power".

Condon retired in 1989 but continued to consult with Bell Labs for another 10 years.

Death
Condon died on January 2, 2012.

Personal character
Joe is said to have been a "natural teacher" who "drew on his deep understanding of physics when explaining a problem in either basic physics or digital design", in addition to having unlimited curiosity, extensive knowledge, and a delightful sense of humor. His designs were said to be parsimonious. His personal interests included American Indian crafts, classical music, the theater and to travel with his wife Carol in their RV. He was very Quaker and a frequent volunteer in the FISH Hospitality Program, a local charity providing shelter for homeless people and single mothers.

External links
Unix: An Oral History

References

1935 births
2012 deaths
American computer scientists
American computer programmers
People from New Jersey
Johns Hopkins University alumni
Scientists at Bell Labs
Northwestern University alumni
Unix people